Guntur famine also known as known locally as Dokkala Karuvu (only ribs are seen without any flesh) or Nandana karuvu,  pedda karuvu, Dhatu karuvu, Valasa Karuvu, Musti karuvu, Dobba Karuvu. This has occurred in Madras Presidency during 1832–1833 followed crop failure as well as excessive and uncertain levels of taxation on peasants by British East India Company.

Deaths
This famine has killed a third of the population 150,000 of 500,000 of starvation, also 74,000 bullocks, 159,000 milk cattle, and 300,000 sheep and goats. The loss of revenue occasioned to Government during the following 15 years exceeded two and a half millions Pound sterling
The famine of 1833 extended southwards to Madras.

See also
 Bengal famine of 1943
 Famine in India

References

1830s health disasters
1830s in British India
1830s in India
1832 disasters in India
1832 in India
1833 disasters in India
1833 in India
British Indian history
Disasters in Andhra Pradesh
Famines in British India
Famines in India
Guntur
History of Andhra Pradesh
Madras Presidency
British East India Company
19th-century famines